Live at the Cafe Carpe (or more completely Live at the Cafe Carpe: Fort Atkinson, Wisconsin, December 2008 & 2009) is a live recording by Redbird (Jeffrey Foucault, Kris Delmhorst and Peter Mulvey), released in 2011.

Reception

Writing for Allmusic, critic William Ruhlman wrote that of the album, "In putting together a repertoire to play to live audiences, the trio sometimes risks coming off as a novelty act, however, as they get laughs for "What Made Milwaukee Famous (Has Made a Loser Out of Me)" and the group-written "Phonebooth of Love." Such numbers serve as light entertainment and changes of pace in a show, but don't work as well on repeated listenings of a disc. Still, the singers in Redbird have a workable concept for their group..."

Track listing
 "I'm Beginning to See the Light" (Duke Ellington, Don George, Johnny Hodges, Harry James) – 2:56
"Strangers" (Kris Delmhorst) – 3:18
"What Made Milwaukee Famous (Has Made a Loser Out of Me)" (Glenn Sutton) – 3:10
"Come All Ye Fair and Tender Ladies" (Traditional) – 5:37
"For the Turnstiles" (Neil Young) – 4:47
"Ships" (Greg Brown) – 3:20
"Snowed In" (David Goodrich) – 4:12
"Let the Mermaids Flirt with Me" (Mississippi John Hurt) – 3:01
"Silver Wings" (Merle Haggard) – 3:58
"Ooh La La" (Ronnie Lane, Ronnie Wood) – 3:33
"Phonebooth of Love" (Delmhorst, Jeffrey Foucault, Goodrich, Peter Mulvey, Barry Rothman) – 4:21
"Stewart's Coat" (Rickie Lee Jones) – 3:58
"Sad, Sad, Sad, Sad (And Far Away from Home)" (Mulvey) – 2:54	
"4 & 20 Blues" (Foucault) – 3:35

Personnel
Kris Delmhorst - guitar, vocals
Jeffrey Foucault - guitar, vocals
Peter Mulvey - guitar, vocals
David Goodrich - guitar
Production notes:
Ian Kennedy – mastering
David Goodrich – mixing
Peter Mulvey – mixing
Satchel Paige Welch – engineer

References

2011 albums
Kris Delmhorst albums
Jeffrey Foucault albums
Peter Mulvey albums